The Francis Crick Institute (formerly the UK Centre for Medical Research and Innovation) is a biomedical research centre in London, which was established in 2010 and opened in 2016. The institute is a partnership between Cancer Research UK, Imperial College London, King's College London (KCL), the Medical Research Council, University College London (UCL) and the Wellcome Trust. The institute has 1,500 staff, including 1,250 scientists, and an annual budget of over £100 million, making it the biggest single
biomedical laboratory in Europe.

The institute is named after the molecular biologist, biophysicist, and neuroscientist Francis Crick, co-discoverer of the structure of DNA, who shared the 1962 Nobel Prize for Physiology and Medicine with James Watson and Maurice Wilkins. Unofficially, the Crick has been called Sir Paul's Cathedral, a reference to Sir Paul Nurse and St Paul's Cathedral in London.

History

Background
In 2003, the Medical Research Council decided that its National Institute for Medical Research (NIMR) would need to relocate from Mill Hill. A Task Force, one of whose external members was Sir Paul Nurse, was established to consider options. Sites eventually rejected included Addenbrooke's and the National Temperance Hospital.

On 11 February 2005, it was announced that NIMR would relocate to University College London, but this was dependent on funding from the government's Large Facilities Capital Fund and did not proceed.

In December 2006, the Cooksey Review, commissioned by the Chancellor Gordon Brown in March, was published. It assessed the strategic priorities of UK health research, highlighting in particular the importance of translating basic research into health and economic benefits.

Founding: initially named as UKCMRI 

The creation of the UK Centre for Medical Research and Innovation (UKCMRI) was announced by the then British Prime Minister, Gordon Brown, on 5 December 2007. On 13 June 2008, the 3.5 acre eventual site on Brill Place was bought for UKCMRI for £85m, of which £46.75m was provided by MRC.

David Cooksey was chair of the Francis Crick Institute from 2009 to August 2017.

On 15 July 2010 it was announced that Nobel laureate Paul Nurse would be the first director and chief executive of the UKCMRI. He took up his post on 1 January 2011. On 20 October 2010, the Chancellor of the Exchequer, George Osborne, confirmed that the British Government would be contributing £220 million over four years towards the capital cost of the centre.

Finally, on 11 November 2010, Cancer Research UK, the Medical Research Council, UCL and the Wellcome Trust signed an agreement to establish the UKCMRI as a charitable foundation, subject to the agreement of the Charity Commission. On 14 December 2010, Camden Council granted the planning approval for the scheme which had been submitted on 1 September.

On 15 April 2011 it was announced that Imperial College London and King's College London would be joining the UKCMRI as partners and that both had signed a memorandum of understanding to commit £40 million each to the project.

Renamed as Francis Crick Institute 
On 25 May 2011, it was announced that the UKCMRI would be renamed the Francis Crick Institute in July to coincide with ground being broken on the construction of its building, in honour of the British scientist and Nobel Prize winner Francis Crick. In July 2011 the UKCMRI was renamed the Francis Crick Institute. A dedication ceremony for the new building was held on 11 October 2011, attended by Mayor of London Boris Johnson, David Willetts MP and Sir Paul Nurse. Francis Crick's surviving daughter Gabrielle gave a short speech, while his son Mike donated Crick's California licence plate "AT GC" into a time capsule buried during the ceremony. On 6 June 2013 a topping out ceremony was held, the institute's science strategy was announced and a £3 million grant from the Wolfson Foundation was confirmed.

In mid August 2016, construction work finished and the building was handed over. The first scientists moved in on 1 September. On 9 November 2016 the Francis Crick Institute was officially opened by the Queen, accompanied by the Duke of Edinburgh and the Duke of York. During the visit a portrait of Francis Crick by Robert Ballagh was unveiled. As part of her tour, The Queen started the sequencing of the genome of the Crick's director, Sir Paul Nurse – all three billion letters in his DNA code.

Governance and organisation

Leadership 
The Crick is a registered charity led by a board of trustees, an executive committee, a scientific management committee and a scientific advisory board.  the board is chaired by John Browne and includes Maggie Dallman, David Lomas, Robert Lechler, Kate Bingham, Jeremy Farrar, Isabelle Ealet, Iain Foulkes, Brian Gilvary, Ottoline Leyser, Menelas N. Pangalos and Fiona Watt.

The executive committee is staffed by Paul Nurse (director and chief executive) and includes Sam Barrell (chief operating officer), Richard Treisman (director of research), Steven J. Gamblin, Malcolm Irving, Fiona Roberts, Stephane Maikovsky, Jane Hughes and Dan Fitz.

Partners
The participants in the Francis Crick Institute providing funding for its construction and establishment were:

Research

Areas of research
The institute is a biomedical discovery institute aiming to help understand why disease develops and to find new ways to treat, diagnose and prevent illnesses such as cancer, heart disease, stroke, infections and neurodegenerative diseases.

The absence of any mental illness research was contrary to the avowed UK push for 'parity of esteem' for mental health.

Current science programme
The institute defines its research programme as exploring "seven high-level science questions reflecting both major issues of interest in biomedical research and the current research strategies of its six founders". According to the institute, these questions are:

 How does a living organism acquire form and function?
 How do organisms maintain health and balance throughout life and as they age?
 How can we use biological knowledge to better understand, diagnose and treat human disease?
 How does cancer start, spread and respond to therapy?
 How does the immune system know whether, when and how to react?
 How do microbes and pathogens function and interact with their hosts?
 How does the nervous system detect, store and respond to information and retain that information throughout life?

In July 2015 GlaxoSmithKline was announced as the institute's first commercial partner. The deal involves contribution of resources and personnel to joint projects.

In May 2022, The Francis Crick Institute announced it had received a £50 million pledge from the Chris Banton Foundation, the largest individual philanthropic pledge in the institute's five-year history. The pledge will fund a new meeting hub initiative to accelerate the translation of Crick discoveries into societal benefits.

Achievements and impact
In 2015, Tomas Lindahl, Emeritus group leader at the Francis Crick Institute and Emeritus director of Cancer Research UK at Clare Hall Laboratory, Hertfordshire, was awarded the Nobel Prize in Chemistry together with Paul Modrich and Aziz Sancar.

In 2016, Professor Tim Bliss, from the Crick, and Professors Graham Collingridge (University of Bristol) and Richard Morris (University of Edinburgh) were awarded The Brain Prize.

Building and facilities

The Francis Crick Institute is located in a state-of-the-art building, opened in 2016, built next to St Pancras railway station in the Camden area of Central London. It consists of four reinforced concrete blocks up to eight storeys high plus four basement levels.

As well as state of the art scientific equipment, much of it extremely sensitive to vibration and electromagnetic emissions, and requiring advanced methods of air handling, over a third of the building is given over to plant rooms and services distribution. The facility incorporates a combined heat and power plant in order to provide low-carbon onsite power. Solar panels installed in the roof provide extra renewable power and all light fittings are energy-efficient. The roof also hides the heating and cooling units. A third of the building is below ground to reduce its visible size and provide further protection to sensitive equipment.

Laboratories within the building are arranged over four floors, made up of four interconnected blocks, designed to encourage interaction between scientists working in different research fields. The institute also includes a public exhibition/gallery space, an educational space, a 450-seat auditorium and a community facility.

'Paradigm', a 14-metre high sculpture made of weathered steel and designed by the British artist Conrad Shawcross, was installed outside the main entrance to the institute in 2016. It is one of the largest public sculptures in London.

Construction timeline
In July 2008 Arup Project Management, who had previously been involved in site evaluation studies, were appointed by the client UKCMRI as project manager for the institute's chosen location at Brill Place. In August the full professional team was appointed, including architect and lead designer HOK, AKT II (structural engineer), Arup (building services engineering) and Turner & Townsend (cost managers). In 2010 PLP Architecture was appointed to collaborate with HOK on the building's external envelope and BMJ architects were retained as a biological research facilities consultant.

Following planning approval by Camden in December 2010, Laing O'Rourke was appointed as main contractor in March 2011.

Construction began in July 2011 and reached practical completion on time and within budget in August 2016, with researchers starting work in the new building in September.

The construction cost was £465 million  and including fit-out of the building the capital cost of the project was approximately £700 million.

References

External links

 The Queen opens the Francis Crick Institute

 
Buildings and structures in the London Borough of Camden
Cancer organisations based in the United Kingdom
Charities based in London
Health in the London Borough of Camden
Medical research institutes in the United Kingdom
Organisations based in the London Borough of Camden
Research in the United Kingdom
Research institutes established in 2007
2007 establishments in England
Wellcome Trust
University College London